Vieira Park is a park in San Jose, California, on Communications Hill.

History

Vieira Park was laid out and dedicated in 2004.

The park is named after the Vieira family, a prominent Portuguese-American family of San Jose, of Azorean origin, which has owned land on Communications Hill since 1896.

Location

Vieira Park sits atop Communications Hill.

The park has an outlook of Santa Clara Valley and Santa Cruz Mountains.

See also
Communications Hill

References

External links

Vieira Park at City of San José Parks & Recreation

Parks in San Jose, California